"The Sun Has Come Your Way" is a song written by Peter Agren and Tobias Karlsson and produced by David Eriksen. The song was recorded by Pop Idol contestants Sam Nixon and Mark Rhodes, under their collective name Sam & Mark and was released as a single in May 2004. The single peaked at number 19 in the United Kingdom.

Track listing
"The Sun Has Come Your Way" - 3:17
"I'm Gonna Be With You" - 2:35
"These Days" - 4:14

Charts

References

2004 singles
Sam & Mark songs
Songs written by Tobias Karlsson (songwriter)
2004 songs
19 Recordings singles
Songs written by Peter Ågren